Jose O. Juliano is a Filipino physicist and chemist.

Biography
Jose Juliano was born on October 16, 1932 and obtained his master's degree in chemistry from the Louisiana State University and a Ph.D. from the University of California. He also has a bachelor's degree in agriculture from the University of the Philippines. He worked for the American Nuclear, Physical and Chemical Societies. He was awarded the TOYM award for his participation in the nuclear physics in 1959. Since 1995 he was a Consultant of Canlubang, Industrial Estate and from 1993 to 2002 worked at the National Academy of Science and Technology. From 1996 to 1998 he worked as Undersecretary for International Relations, Department of Trade and Industry  and by 1999 became a president and CEO of the Calamba Medical Center Board.

References

1932 births
Living people
21st-century American chemists
Filipino chemists
Filipino physicists
21st-century American physicists
Louisiana State University alumni
University of California alumni
University of the Philippines alumni